Bradley Smith (born 28 September 1969) is a former English cricketer. Smith was a right-handed batsman who bowled right-arm medium pace. He was born at Margate, Kent.

Smith represented the Sussex Cricket Board in a single List A match against Hertfordshire in the 1999 NatWest Trophy.  In his only List A match, he scored 16 runs and took a single catch in the field.

References

External links
Bradley Smith at Cricinfo
Bradley Smith at CricketArchive

1969 births
Living people
People from Margate
English cricketers
Sussex Cricket Board cricketers